Solza is a rural locality (a village) in Nyonokskiy Administrative okrug of Severodvinsk Urban okrug, Arkhangelsk Oblast, Russia. The population was 49 as of 2010.

References 

Rural localities in Severodvinsk Urban Okrug
Severodvinsk Urban Okrug